WIFF or wiff may refer to:

People
 Donald Ray Wiff, an American physicist
 Bill Hunt (alpine skier), also known as Wiff Hunt

Radio
 WIFF (FM), a radio station (90.1 FM) licensed to serve Windsor, New York, United States
 WGBJ, a radio station (102.3 FM ) licensed to serve Auburn, Indiana, United States, which held the call sign WIFF-FM from 1967 to 1995
 WGLL, a radio station (1570 AM) licensed to serve Auburn, which held the call sign WIFF from 1967 until 1997

Other
 Wiff, to strike-out, the name origin for the sport of Wiffle ball
 Walthamstow International Film Festival
 Windsor International Film Festival
 .wiff, a file format used by Analyst mass spectrometry software

See also
 Whiff (disambiguation)
 wiff-waff, a nickname for ping-pong